John Short, of Glenfalloch, was a Scottish politician.

Biography
He was provost of Stirling from 1644 to 1647 and from 1649 to 1652, and represented the burgh in Parliament from 1646 to 1647 and from 1648 to 1651, and at Conventions of Burghs in 1649 and 1650. He died in 1652.

References

1652 deaths
Provosts in Scotland
People from Stirling
Members of the Parliament of Scotland 1644–1647
Members of the Parliament of Scotland 1648–1651
Burgh Commissioners to the Parliament of Scotland